The 2014–15 NCAA Division II men's ice hockey season began on October 31, 2014 and concluded on February 28 of the following year. This was the 33rd season of second-tier college ice hockey.

Regular season

Standings

See also
 2014–15 NCAA Division I men's ice hockey season
 2014–15 NCAA Division III men's ice hockey season

References

External links

 
NCAA